George Caley (10 June 1770 – 23 May 1829) was an English botanist and explorer, active in Australia for the majority of his career.

Early life
Caley was born in Craven, Yorkshire, England, the son of a horse-dealer. He was educated at the Free Grammar School at Manchester for around four years and was then taken into his father's stables. According to a letter which was sent to William Withering on 15 June 1798, he started teaching himself botany after he coming across a volume of book about farriery which was written by William Gibson cause he became interested in the herbs mentioned in prescriptions. He started learning botany by studying Botanical arrangement (1787-92) by William Withering.  He changed his job to that of a weaver in order to allow himself to spent more time with his associate in Manchester School of Botanists  which consist of John Mellor, James Crowther, and John Dewhurst. This school was also attended by John Horsefield on 1808. In March 1795 he wrote to Sir Joseph Banks who, after warning him about the small financial rewards to be expected by a botanist for his labour, suggested that he might be able to obtain work for him as a gardener's labourer, which would give opportunities of increasing his knowledge. He worked in Kew Gardens and other gardens.

Australia

Banks appointed Caley as a botanical collector in New South Wales in 1798. He was given a free passage to Sydney aboard the Speedy, where he arrived on 15 April 1800. He was paid weekly wage of 15 shillings, was allowed rations by the government and he was also given a cottage at Parramatta. Governor King, writing to Banks in September 1800, expressed his intention to establish a botanical garden near the cottage. Caley was assisted by Daniel Moowattin an Aboriginal man of the Darug people. Daniel was Caley's interpreter, bush guide, gatherer of plant and animal specimens, bird-trapper, servant and companion on expeditions around Sydney. 

Caley sent many botanical and other specimens to Banks and his letters also kept Banks informed of the general conditions of the colony as well as scientific matters. Caley was the first to make a serious effort to study the Eucalyptus. In 1801 Caley went with Lieutenant James Grant to Western Port and in 1804 he gave King a long report on "A journey to ascertain the Limits or Boundaries of Vaccary Forest" (the Cowpastures). Caley was able to report on the wild cattle, which he found considerably increased in numbers. In November 1804 Caley, with three convict assistants, attempted to cross the Blue Mountains along the northern edge of the Grose Valley. He managed to reach and ascend a mountain he named Mount Banks. However, upon being struck by the awe-inspiring views of the sheer cliffs of the Grose Valley stretching away to the south, he decided to turn back, unaware he was only a day's walk away from the western escarpment and the open country lying beyond. In October 1805 he visited Norfolk Island and went to Hobart at the end of November that year.

In August 1808 Banks wrote to Caley offering him an annuity of £50 a year and to release him from all services beyond what he voluntarily wished to perform and to remain in New South Wales if he desired. Caley was homesick for England, however, and decided to return to England.

Later life
Caley returned to England in 1810 and in 1816 was appointed curator of the botanic gardens in St Vincent, West Indies. He resigned from this position in December 1822 and was back in England in the following May. He died on 23 May 1829. He had married in 1816 but his wife predeceased him without children.

Governor King found Caley 'eccentric and morose', both Banks and King found Caley difficult and at times tactless and unreasonable. He was, however, a good worker, a skilful and accurate botanist and he was thoroughly honest. He did not publish any works, but his collections did much to spread a knowledge of Australian plants in the early years of the nineteenth century.  This botanist is denoted by the author abbreviation Caley when citing a botanical name. He is recognised in several place names, including a Reserve name and bushland pavilion name at Ku-ring-gai Wildflower Garden in St Ives, and in the orchid genus Caleana and the species Grevillea caleyi, Viola caleyana, Banksia caleyi, and Eucalyptus caleyi.  A George Caley Society was formed in Saint Ives (New South Wales) in 2019.

See also
 List of Blue Mountains articles
 List of gardener-botanist explorers of the Enlightenment

References

Bibliography
 Webb, J. B., (2003), ‘George Caley – Robert Brown’s collecting partner’, Australian Garden History, 15 (1), pp. 15–16.

Additional sources listed by the Australian Dictionary of Biography:
Historical Records of New South Wales, vols 3-6; J. Cash, Where There's a Will there's a Way, or Science in the Cottage (London, 1873); J. H. Maiden, Sir Joseph Banks (Sydney, 1909); J. H. Maiden, ‘George Caley, Botanical Collector in NSW’, Agricultural Gazette of New South Wales, 14 (1904); R. Else-Mitchell, ‘George Caley: His Life and Work’, Journal and Proceedings (Royal Australian Historical Society), vol 25, part 6, 1939, pp 437-542; L. A. Gilbert, Botanical Investigation of Eastern Seaboard Australia, 1788-1810 (M.A. thesis, University of New England, 1962); manuscript catalogue under G. Caley (State Library of New South Wales); G. Caley letters (State Library of New South Wales)

External links
 Account of Caley's attempt to cross the Blue Mountains

English botanists
English explorers
1770 births
1829 deaths
Botanists with author abbreviations
Botanists active in Australia
Explorers of Australia
People from the Blue Mountains (New South Wales)
18th-century British botanists
19th-century British botanists